Dead Man's Suit is the debut studio album by British singer-songwriter and musician Jon Allen, released on 01 June 2009 on Monologue Records in the UK.

Track listing

References

2009 debut albums
Jon Allen (musician) albums